Daphnella aureola is a species of sea snail, a marine gastropod mollusk in the family Raphitomidae.

Description
The length of the shell varies between 9 mm and 22 mm.

The thin, transparent shell is spirally ridged, longitudinally very finely closely striated. The outer lip is crenulated within The small sinus is distinct. The shell has a pale golden color.

Distribution
This marine species occurs off the Philippines and in the Western Pacific Ocean.

References

 Reeve, L.A. 1845. Monograph of the genus Pleurotoma. pls 20-33 in Reeve, L.A. (ed). Conchologia Iconica. London : L. Reeve & Co. Vol. 1.
 Severns, M. (2011). Shells of the Hawaiian Islands - The Sea Shells. Conchbooks, Hackenheim. 564 pp
 Liu J.Y. [Ruiyu] (ed.). (2008). Checklist of marine biota of China seas. China Science Press. 1267 pp.

External links
 
 Gastropods.com: Daphnella (Daphnella) aureola

aureola
Gastropods described in 1845